The Syrian records in swimming are the fastest ever performances of swimmers from Syria, which are recognised and ratified by the Syrian Arab Swimming and Aquatic Sports Federation.

All records were set in finals unless noted otherwise.

Long Course (50 m)

Men

Women

Short Course (25 m)

Men

Women

References

Syria
Records
Swimming
Swimming